Chhimtuipui District was one of the original three districts of Mizoram: Aizawl, Lunglei and Chhimtuipui. Chhimtuipui District had an area of 3,957 km2. and its headquarters was at Saiha.

Administration
Subdivisional headquarters were at Lawngtlai and Chawngte. Chhimtuipui District was divided into four rural development blocks, namely Lawngtlai, Sangau, Tuipang and Chawngte. In November 1998 Lawngtlai District was created out of Chhimtuipui District, consisting of the Lawngtlai RD Block and the Chawngte RD Block.  The remaining area of Sangau RD Block and Tuipang RD Block was still called Chhimtuipui District, but the reduced district's name was soon changed to Saiha district.

Demographics
In addition to Mizo, Kuki-Chin languages spoken in southern Mizoram (Chhimtuipui District and neighboring Lunglei District) include:
Hakha Chin language
Mara languages
Ralte language
Bawm language
Pangkhu language

Notes

Districts of Mizoram